Ravenskull may mean:

Ravenskull (manga), an original English-language manga written by Chris Vogler, illustrated by Elmer Damaso and published by Seven Seas Entertainment
Ravenskull (video game), a BBC Micro/Acorn Electron arcade adventure by Martin Edmondson & Nicholas Chamberlain and published by Superior Software in 1986